Pierre-Nérée Dorion (October 16, 1816 – 1874) was a land surveyor and political figure in Quebec, Canada. He represented Drummond—Arthabaska in the House of Commons of Canada from 1872 to 1874 as a Liberal member.

He was born in Sainte-Anne-de-la-Pérade, Lower Canada, the son of Pierre-Antoine Dorion and Genevieve Bureau, and educated at the Séminaire de Nicolet. In 1846, he married Mary Ann Marler. Dorion was mayor of Grantham and also served as warden for Drummond County.

His brother Antoine-Aimé Dorion also served in the House of Commons and his brother Jean-Baptiste-Éric Dorion served in the assembly for the Province of Canada.

References 

1816 births
1874 deaths
Members of the House of Commons of Canada from Quebec
Liberal Party of Canada MPs
Mayors of places in Quebec